Indah Water Konsortium Sdn. Bhd. (doing business as  Indah Water or IWK) is a Malaysian national wastewater and sanitation company. It is a government-owned company under the Minister of Finance Incorporated, which has the task of developing and maintaining a modern and efficient sewerage system for West Malaysia. Its operations and management was well-organized in compliance with standards from the Department of Environment.

History
Indah Water was established on 2 April 1994 when the Federal Government granted the company, a concession for nationwide sewerage services which prior to that, was under the responsibility of local authorities. Since then, Indah Water has taken over the sewerage services from local authorities in all areas except the States of Sabah, Sarawak, Johor Bahru and Pasir Gudang Municipal Council in Johor.

In June 2000, the Government ensured that a well-organized and efficient sewerage system was maintained effectively. The Minister of Finance Incorporated has acquired all equity in Indah Water from its former private owners.

The company shares its wastewater management expertise with several Asian countries under their IWK 2020 Transformation Plan (ITP2020) initiated in 2017. The plan will focus on four different pillars namely human capital development, innovation, automation and technology.

As of February 2019, Indah Water served more than 25 million population equivalent, operate and maintain more than 7,000 sewage treatment plants and around 20,000 km underground sewage pipelines.

In December 2019, Indah Water launches a coffee-table book entitled Indah Water Memacu Negara (Indah Water Spurring the Nation) to coincide with its 25th anniversary.

On 1 January 2021, Indah Water took over Kelantan's sewerage.

See also
 Water supply and sanitation in Malaysia
 Sanitation

References

External links

 

Government-owned companies of Malaysia
Minister of Finance (Incorporated) (Malaysia)
Privately held companies of Malaysia
Malaysian companies established in 1994
Water supply and sanitation in Malaysia
Water companies of Malaysia
Companies based in Kuala Lumpur
1994 establishments in Malaysia